The 2014 Michigan Attorney General election took place on November 4, 2014, to elect the Attorney General of Michigan. Incumbent Republican Attorney General Bill Schuette was re-elected to a second term in office with 52.11% of the vote.

Republican Party

Candidates

Declared
 Bill Schuette, incumbent Attorney General

Democratic Party

Candidates

Declared
 Mark Totten, law professor at Michigan State University and candidate for the State Senate in 2010

Withdrew
 Godfrey Dillard, attorney and candidate for Michigan's 15th congressional district in 1996 (running for Secretary of State)

Minor parties

Libertarian Party
 Justin Altman, attorney

Green Party
 John Anthony La Pietra, attorney, nominee for Secretary of State in 2010 and nominee for Calhoun County Clerk and Register of Deeds in 2008 and 2012

Taxpayers Party
 Gerald Van Sickle, nominee for attorney general in 2002 and 2010

General election

Polling

Results

References

External links
 Bill Schuette for Attorney General
 Mark Totten for Attorney General
 John Anthony La Pietra Attorney General

Attorney General
Michigan Attorney General elections
November 2014 events in the United States
Michigan